Marc-André Bédard may refer to:

 Marc-André Bédard (politician) (1935–2020), Canadian politician
 Marc-André Bédard (biathlete) (born 1986), Canadian biathlete